Alan Robert Graham (born June 20, 1942) is a Canadian retired politician in the Province of New Brunswick and he is the father of Shawn Graham, who was Premier of New Brunswick from 2006 to 2010.

Family history
Alan Graham, the longest serving consecutive term of anyone in the history of the Legislative Assembly of New Brunswick is a son of Harrison Michael Graham (1901–1983) and Nellie Harris Ross (1900–1958).

Longevity
Graham served the longest consecutive term of anyone in the history of the Legislative Assembly of New Brunswick, being re-elected in 1970, 1974, 1978, 1982, 1987, 1991 and 1995.

Liberal politics
A Liberal, supporter of the government of Louis Robichaud from 1967–1970 and then served in opposition for 17 years until the Liberals returned to government by winning every seat in the 1987 election. Graham served in the cabinets of Frank McKenna and Ray Frenette but resigned his seat in 1998 and in the subsequent Kent County by-election, the community continued to support the Graham family and his son Shawn Graham was elected as MLA in 1998 and would go on to become leader of the Liberals in 2002, and win the 2006 election.

Later political career
Graham was the Minister of Agriculture from 1987–1991, Minister of Natural Resources and Energy from 1991 to 1998 and served on Cabinet committees of Policy and Priorities, Board of Management, and Budget. From 1997-1998, he was Deputy Premier of New Brunswick. During his political career, Graham served on numerous Legislative Committees. While in opposition, he acted as critic for Agriculture, Natural Resources, Housing, Health, and Alcoholism and Drug Dependency. He was also Liberal Caucus Chairperson and Opposition House Leader.  He was first appointed a member of the former Atomic Energy Control Board in 1999, and has since been reappointed a member of the Canadian Nuclear Safety Commission. He has been a Trustee of the Nature Conservancy of Canada, a member of the Board of the Atlantic Salmon Federation and an Honorary President of the Atlantic Canada Woodworking Centre of Excellence.

References
Nuclear Safety, Government of Canada, Profiles of Commission Members
Government of New Brunswick Legislature, Past Sessions
Kent County Gen Web Cemetery transcripts and other genealogical information.
Automated Genealogy Census reports and other genealogical data
Newspaper Transcripts by Daniel F. Johnson
Irish Cultural Association of New Brunswick featuring the Descendants of John and Ann Graham of Main River.
New Brunswick Irish Portal
1861 Census of Kent County, published by Provincial Archives of New Brunswick.

Canadian businesspeople
Members of the Executive Council of New Brunswick
New Brunswick Liberal Association MLAs
People from Kent County, New Brunswick
Université de Moncton alumni
1942 births
Living people
Deputy premiers of New Brunswick